Mesoceros is a genus of hornworts belonging to the family Notothyladaceae.

The species of this genus are found in Australia.

Species:

Mesoceros mesophoros 
Mesoceros porcatus

References

Hornworts
Bryophyte genera